Karl Zilas Görling (April 21, 1911, Hudiksvall – April 11, 1960, Stockholm) was a Swedish jazz saxophonist. His brother was Miff Görling.

The Görling brothers both played in Frank Vernon's band in the late 1920s and early 1930s. Zilas Görling also played in the TOGO group (sv) throughout the 1930s. From 1934 to 1938 Görling was in Arne Hülphers's band. He then joined Sune Lundwall's group for most of the duration of World War II. His other associations included work with Dick de Pauw, Charles Redland, Håkan von Eichwald, Helge Lindberg, Benny Carter, Thore Jederby, and Gösta Törner.

References
Erik Kjellberg, "Zilas Görling". The New Grove Dictionary of Jazz. 2nd edition, ed. Barry Kernfeld.

1911 births
1960 deaths
Swedish jazz saxophonists
Male saxophonists
20th-century saxophonists
People from Hudiksvall Municipality
20th-century Swedish male musicians
20th-century Swedish musicians
Male jazz musicians